The Musée du Parfum, also known as the Fragonard Musée du Parfum, is a French private museum of perfume located at 9 rue Scribe, in the 9th arrondissement of Paris.

History and exhibits
Fragonard Parfumeur established the museum in 1983 within a Napoleon III town-house built in 1860. Its rooms contain period furnishings and perfume exhibits, including antique perfume bottles, containers, toiletry sets, and stills for steam distillation of perfume extracts. Displays show how perfumes are made today and present the history of perfume manufacturing and packaging. A perfume organ on display has tiers of ingredient bottles arranged around a balance used to mix fragrances.

See also
 Théâtre-Musée des Capucines, another Fragonard perfume museum in Paris
 List of museums in Paris

References

External links

 Musée du Parfum

Museums in Paris
Musee du Parfum
Musee du Parfum
Fashion museums in France
Museums established in 1983
Musee du Parfum